Indonesia Pro Futsal League (Indonesian: Liga Futsal Profesional) is the top league for futsal in Indonesia. It is organized by Indonesian Futsal Federation.

Teams 
The following 12 clubs will be compete in the Indonesia Pro Futsal League during the 2022 season.

List of champions

Champions

List by performance

List of best player

List of top-goalscorers

List of foreign players

See also
 Indonesia national futsal team
 Futsal records in Indonesia
 Indonesia Women's Pro Futsal League

Notes

References

External links
Official Website

Futsal leagues in Indonesia
Futsal competitions in Indonesia
Indonesia
2006 establishments in Indonesia
Sports leagues established in 2006
Futsal